Looc, officially the Municipality of Looc,  is a 4th class municipality in the province of Romblon, Philippines. According to the 2020 census, it has a population of 21,799 people.

History

Early history
Looc is from the Filipino/Onhan word look, meaning "bay", referring to the body of water the town encloses. The first settlers of Looc where Onhan-speaking tribes from Panay Island which came around 1730. The settlement was originally a barrio of the pueblo (town) of Cabolutan (located in present-day San Agustin) until 1790, when the town's population was wiped-out by a smallpox epidemic and the town was abolished.  The abolition transferred Looc under the administration of pueblo de Banton in Banton Island.

In the early 1800s, the settlement continued to progress and increase its population. Thus, in 1844, Spanish colonial authorities converted Looc into a full-pledged pueblo. Back then, Looc was still part of Capiz province, until 19 March 1853, when Romblon was officially declared a district separate from Capiz, and finally a full-pledged province in 1868. Looc was one of the first four municipalities of the newly created province of Romblon, the other three being Romblon (capitol), Banton, and Sibuyan (Cajidiocan). It then comprised the territories of what is now the municipalities of Alcantara and Santa Fe, and Carabao Island. Looc would lose these territories during the American colonial period beginning in 1901.

Modern history
On 8 June 1940, the municipality was abolished by virtue of Commonwealth Act No. 581, also known as the "Festin Bill" (authored by Congressman Leonardo Festin). Looc was then consolidated into the special municipality of Tablas together with all other municipalities in the island and demoted to a barrio with a representative in the town's capitol in Odiongan. During the Japanese Occupation of the Philippines, the town became one of several emergency municipalities sponsored by the guerilla movement in the province. On 1 October 1946, Commonwealth Act No. 581 was repealed by Republic Act No. 38 (authored by Congressman Modesto Formilleza), thus abolishing the special municipality of Tablas and restoring Looc to its municipal status.

On 21 March 1961, the municipality of Alcantara was created from the eastern barangays of Looc, reducing the municipality to its present size. Looc is a nice place to live.

Geography
Looc is located along the shores of Looc Bay on the southern portion of Tablas Island. It is bordered to the north by the municipalities of Ferrol and Odiongan, to east by the municipality of Alcantara, to the south by the municipality of Santa Fe and to the west by Looc Bay and Tablas Strait. Its topography consists predominantly of slopes which are characterized as nearly level to slightly and strongly undulated rolling hills.

Barangays
Looc is politically subdivided into 12 barangays.

Climate

Demographics

According to the 2015 census, Looc has a population of 22,262 people. Majority of its citizen speak to local dialect, Onhan.

Economy

Marine sanctuary
On 12 January 1999, the 48-hectare Looc Bay Marine Refuge and Sanctuary was officially opened in the municipality after four years of intensive community education on the value and better management of marine resources. The local government, together with the community through their Barangay Fishermen Organization and Looc Baywatch Task Force, worked together to ensure the safety of the Looc's marine resources. The marine sanctuary was awarded two Trailblazing Galing Pook awards in 2000 and 2007 by the Galing Pook Foundation for being the best Coastal Resource Management program. Today, the marine sanctuary is not just a refuge of marine wildlife, but a tourist destination which attracts revenues for the municipality.

Government

Pursuant to Chapter II, Title II, Book III of Republic Act 7160 or the Local Government Code of 1991, the municipal government is composed of a mayor (alkalde), a vice mayor (bise alkalde) and members (kagawad) of the legislative branch Sangguniang Bayan alongside a secretary to the said legislature, all of which are elected to a three-year term and are eligible to run for three consecutive terms.

As of 30 June 2019, the incumbent mayor and vice mayor are Lisette Arboleda and Dianson Taytay, respectively.

References

External links
 Official Website of Looc, Romblon
 Looc, Romblon Profile - Cities and Municipalities Competitive Index
 [ Philippine Standard Geographic Code]
 Philippine Census Information
 Local Governance Performance Management System

Municipalities of Romblon